Coffelt is a surname. Notable people with the surname include:

Jon Coffelt (born 1963), American artist 
Leslie Coffelt (1910–1950), American police officer
Soraya Diase Coffelt (born 1958), United States Virgin Islands lawyer and judge